Prathipadu Assembly constituency may refer to
 Prathipadu, Guntur Assembly constituency
 Prathipadu, Kakinada Assembly constituency